Phipps Plaza is a shopping mall in the Buckhead district of Atlanta, Georgia. It is located at the intersection of Peachtree Road (SR 141) and Lenox Road (SR 141 Connector), adjacent to the Phipps Tower office building. The mall is currently owned and managed by Simon Property Group, and is considered a sister mall to the adjacent, Simon-owned Lenox Square. , it is anchored by department stores Nordstrom and Saks Fifth Avenue.

History 

In 1969, Phipps Plaza opened as the first multi-level mall in Atlanta, aiming to become the South's leading shopping destination. The mall originally opened with two levels. Purchased by financier Ogden Phipps in 1966 for less than $600,000, the development was sold in 1992 to Simon Properties  for $488 million. That year, in development as part of a $140 million renovation and expansion, Phipps added a third anchor, Birmingham, Alabama based Parisian, owned by the parent company of Saks Fifth Avenue, to its original anchors Saks Fifth Avenue and Lord & Taylor. This was their second Atlanta area location (their first was at Town Center at Cobb which also opened in 1992) and their flagship. This was followed by the openings of other area stores at Gwinnett Place Mall in 1993 and Northlake Mall in 1994, respectively. The expansion would also add a 14 screen AMC theatre, a new food court, new elevators, and the addition of one new level. Phipps Plaza remains Atlanta's only Saks Fifth Avenue venue.  Lord & Taylor was repositioned and shuttered entirely in 2004. The store served as one of the original anchors for 35 years. The space was eventually completely renovated to make way for Atlanta's third Nordstrom, which opened in March 2005. On August 2, 2006, it was announced that Belk was acquiring the Parisian chain of department stores, with the store being converted to the Belk name in the fall of 2007. In 2010 the food court was renovated into a Legoland Discovery Center.

On November 13, 2017, Belk announced that it would close its location at Phipps Plaza during the summer of 2018.  On November 14, Simon Property Group announced that it would replace Belk with a 150-room Nobu Hotel and restaurant, 300,000 square foot Class A office tower, 90,000 square foot Life Time Athletic facility and a 30,000 square foot food hall.  The hotel and restaurant are expected to open in late 2019 with plans for the other portions of the project to debut in phases in 2020.

In 2021 following a string of shootings and robberies at Lenox, the mall now has security measures in place and requires people under the age of 18 to have adult supervision after 3 pm.

Phipps Plaza mostly has upscale stores not found within hundreds of miles of Atlanta, these include Cole Haan, and Bally, Bottega Veneta, Christian Dior, Celine, Dolce & Gabbana, Fendi, Giuseppe Zanotti, Gucci, Louis Vuitton, Prada, Saint Laurent, Tiffany & Co., Tom Ford, Valentino, Versace, and Vince.

List of Anchor Stores

Current Anchors
Nordstrom (2005-present)
Saks Fifth Avenue (1969-present)

Former Anchors
Belk (2007-2018)
Lord & Taylor (1969-2004)
Parisian (1992-2007)

Architecture 
The mall is known for its interior decor, which consists of mahogany walls, marble floors, glass elevators, chandeliers, and a massive, carpeted staircase.

See also 
 List of shopping malls in the United States
 Lenox Square
 Buckhead Village District

References

External links 
Phipps Plaza Mall
ToNeTo Atlanta

Simon Property Group
Buildings and structures in Atlanta
Shopping malls in the Atlanta metropolitan area
Tourist attractions in Atlanta
Shopping malls established in 1969
1969 establishments in Georgia (U.S. state)